This is a list of compositions by John Philip Sousa.


By genre 
Sources:

Concert Pieces 

 The Summer Girl (1901)
 Willow Blossoms (1916)

Fantasies 
 You’re the Flower of my Heart – Sweet Adeline (1930)
 In The Sweet Bye and Bye (1876)
 Sounds from the Revivals (1876)
 The International Congress (1876)
 Medley (1877)
 Adamsonia (1879)
 Home Sweet Home (1879)
 In Parlor and Street (1880)
 Out of Work (1880)
 Tyrolienne (1880)
 Under the Eaves (1880)
 The Blending of the Blue and the Gray (1887)
 Songs of Grace and Glory (1892)
 The Salute of the Nations (1893)
 Rose, Thistle and Shamrock (1901)
 In the Realm of the Dance (1902)
 A Day at Great Lakes (1915)
 On the 5:15 (1916)
 In Pulpit and Pew (1917)
 A Study in Rhythms (1920)
 An Old-Fashioned Girl (1922)
 Music of the Minute (1922)
 The Merry-Merry Chorus (1923)
 On With The Dance (1923)
 Assembly of the Artisans (1924)
 Jazz America (1925)
 Where My Dreams Come True (1929)

Humoresques 

 Look for the Silver Lining (1885)
 A Little Peach in the Orchard Grew (1885)
 The Stag Party (1885)
 Good-Bye (1892)
 The Band Came Back (1895)
 Showing Off Before Company (1919)
 Swanee (1920)
 Gallagher and Shean (1923)
 What Do You Do Sunday, Mary? (1924)
 The Mingling of the Wets and the Drys (1926)
 Follow the Swallow (1926)
 Oh, How I’ve Waited For You (1926)
 Among My Souvenirs (1928)

Marches

Operettas

Overtures 
 Rivals (1877)
 Tally-Ho! (1886)
 Vautour (1886)
 The Lamb's Gambol (1914)

Songs and Other Vocal Works 

 Fall Tenderly, Roses (1869)
 Day and Night (1873)
 Wilt Thou Be True (1873) 
 Te Deum in B-Flat (1874)
 O My Country (1874)
 Only a Dream (1876)
 Only Thee (1876)
 Ah Me! (1876)
 The Song of the Sea (1876)
 The Magic Glass (1877)
 The Free Lunch Cadets (1877)
 Love Me Little, Love Me Long (1877)
 Lonely (1877)
 Hoping (1877)
 ‘Deed I Has to Laugh (1877)
 Mavourneen Asthore (1878)
 Smick, Smack, Smuck (1878)
 When He Is Near (1880)
 Pretty Patty Honeywood (1881)
 A Rare Old Fellow (1881)
 Star of Light (1882)
 We’ll Follow Where the White Plume Waves (1884)
 The Window Blind (1887)
 Sweet Miss Industry (1887)
 My Own, My Geraldine (1887)
 O Ye Lilies White (1887)
 I Wonder (1888)
 O’Reilly’s Kettledrum (1889)
 Do We? We Do (1889)
 Love That Comes When May-Roses Blow (1889)
 2:15 (1889)
 There’s Something Mysterious (1889)
 You’ll Miss Lots of Fun When You’re Married (1890)
 Nail the Flag to the Mast (1890)
 Reveille (1890)
 Stuffed Stork (1894)
 Maid of the Meadow (1897)
 The Trooping of the Colors (1898) (pageant)
 Oh, Why Should the Spirit of Mortal Be Proud? (1899) (hymn)
 It’s a Thing We Are Apt to Forget (1900)
 The Messiah of Nations (1902) (hymn)
 I’ve Made My Plans for the Summer (1907)
 The Belle of Bayou Teche (1911)
 The Milkmaid (1914)
 We March, We March to Victory (1914) (hymn)
 Boots (1916)
 I Love Jim (1916)
 Come Laugh and Be Merry (1916)
 The Song of the Dagger (1916)
 Blue Ridge, I’m Coming Back to You (1917)
 The Love That Lives Forever (1917)
 When the Boys Come Sailing Home! (1918)
 We Are Coming (1918)
 The Toast (1918)
 Pushing On (1918)
 Lovely Mary Donnelly (1918)
 In Flanders Fields the Poppies Grow (1918)
 The Fighting Race (1919)
 Non-Committal Declarations (1920) (vocal trio) 
 The Last Crusade (1920) (ballad) 
 While Navy Ships Are Coaling (1923)
 The Journal (1924)
 A Serenade in Seville (1924)
 There’s a Merry Brown Thrush (1926)
 Crossing the Bar (1926)
 Forever and a Day (1927)
 Love’s Radiant Hour (1928)
 Annabel Lee (1931)

Suites 

 The Last Days of Pompeii (1893)
 Three Quotations (1895)
 Looking Upward (1902)
 At the King's Court (1904)
 People Who Live in a Glass House (1909)
 Dwellers of a Western World (1910)
 Tales of a Traveler (1911)
 Impressions at the Movies (1915)
 Camera Studies (1920)
 Leaves From My Notebook (1922)
 Cubaland (1925)

Tone Poem 

 Sheridan's Ride (1890)
 The Chariot Race (1891)

Trumpet and Drum 

 Four Marches For Regimental Drums And Trumpets (1884)
 Funeral March (1886)
 Gallant And Gay We'll March Away (1886)
 Good-Bye, Sweet Nannie Magee (1886)
 Hannah, My True Love (1886)
 Here's To Your Health, Sir! (1886)
 Hurrah! We Are Almost There (1886)
 Waltz (1886)
 With Steady Step (1886)

Waltzes and Other Dances 

 Moonlight on the Potomac (1872)
 Cuckoo (1873) (galop)
 La Reine D’Amour (1874)
 Alexander (1876) (gavotte) 
 Myrrha (1876) (gavotte) 
 Sardanapalus (1877)
 Silver Spray (1878) (schottische)
 Paroles D’Amour (1880)
 Intaglio Waltzes (1884)
 Wissahickon (1885)
 Presidential Polonaise (1886)
 Sandalphon Waltzes (1886)
 La Reine de la Mer (1886)
 The Coquette (1887) (caprice)
 The Colonial Dames (1896)
 The Lady of the White House (1897)
 Queen of the Harvest (1899) (quadrille)
 The Gliding Girl (1912) (tango) 
 With Pleasure (Dance Hilarious) (1912)
 Love’s But A Dance, Where Time Plays The Fiddle (1923) (foxtrot) 
 Peaches and Cream (1924) (foxtrot)
 The Coeds of Michigan (1925)

References 

 
Sousa, John Philip